The 2022 Saskatchewan Roughriders season was the 64th season for the team in the Canadian Football League. It was the club's 113th year overall, and its 106th season of play. The Roughriders were eliminated from post-season contention on October 22, 2022, following a loss to the Calgary Stampeders. The Roughriders failed to qualify for the playoffs for the first time since 2016. The 2022 CFL season was the third season under head coach Craig Dickenson and general manager Jeremy O'Day.

Offseason

CFL Global Draft
The 2022 CFL Global Draft took place on May 3, 2022. The Roughriders selected fifth in each round of the snake draft.

CFL National Draft
The 2022 CFL Draft took place on May 3, 2022. The Roughriders had the seventh selection in each of the eight rounds of the draft after losing the West Final and finishing second in the 2021 league standings.

Preseason

Regular season

Standings

Schedule 
The Roughriders played in a neutral site game against the Toronto Argonauts who was the home team for their Week 6 match-up. It was confirmed on March 24, 2022, that the game would be played in Wolfville, Nova Scotia at Raymond Field as part of the Touchdown Atlantic series. Due to a COVID-19 outbreak, the home game against the Argonauts was rescheduled from July 23 to July 24.

Team

Roster

Coaching staff

References

External links
 

Saskatchewan Roughriders seasons
2022 Canadian Football League season by team
2022 in Saskatchewan